Zug Postplatz railway station is a railway station in the municipality of Zug, in the Swiss canton of Zug. It is an intermediate stop on the standard gauge Thalwil–Arth-Goldau line of Swiss Federal Railways.

Services 
 the following services stop at Zug Postplatz:

References

External links 
 
 

Railway stations in the canton of Zug
Swiss Federal Railways stations